New Hampshire Route 140 is a  east–west state highway in central New Hampshire, running from Tilton to Alton.  The western terminus of NH 140 is in Tilton at an intersection with U.S. Route 3, New Hampshire Route 11 and New Hampshire Route 132, located at exit 20 on Interstate 93. The eastern terminus is in Alton at NH 11 and New Hampshire Route 28A (Main Street). In Alton, the road is named the Frank C. Gilman Highway.

NH 140 (along with I-93) is commonly used as an alternative for motorists during the busiest NASCAR events at New Hampshire Motor Speedway in Loudon.   The main highway to the speedway, New Hampshire Route 106, is converted to one-way traffic to accommodate the increased amount of traffic.

Major intersections

References

External links 

 New Hampshire State Route 140 on Flickr

140
Transportation in Belknap County, New Hampshire
Transportation in Merrimack County, New Hampshire